The Netherlands national rugby sevens team is a minor national sevens side. They have competed in the Hong Kong Sevens since the 1980s. They are traditionally seen as "minnows", but have not been completely unsuccessful.

EURFC member Rob Cuthbertson has been recently added to the squad after a successful trip to Casablanca. Having had previous experience at international level with England it is hoped that he will add some much needed talent to the squad.

Tournament History

Rugby World Cup Sevens

1989 Hong Kong Sevens
In the 1989 Hong Kong Sevens, they beat Bahrain by a large margin: 24-4. 

In the 1988 Hong Kong Sevens, one of their players, Marcel Bierman broke his neck in a tackle, subsequently requiring a wheelchair as an assistive device. Naturally, this did not do rugby union in the Netherlands many favours.

In the 1989, Hong Kong Sevens, the Dutch team had another claim to fame: it included no less than four brothers Hans, Andre, Mats and Peter Marcker.

McLaren was particularly impressed by Bart Wierenga
"the player who made the biggest impression was a gangly lad with a head of hair like a wind-blown thatched cottage, Bart Wierenga, who ran his heart out in a series of tingling performances."

On the team's lap of honour, Wierenga wheeled Marcel Bierman around the pitch, who had been paralyzed the previous year to loud cheers and claps from the audience.

Hong Kong Sevens

See also
 Rugby union in the Netherlands
 Netherlands national rugby union team

References
 McLaren, Bill A Visit to Hong Kong in Starmer-Smith, Nigel & Robertson, Ian (eds) The Whitbread Rugby World '90 (Lennard Books, 1989)

Netherlands national rugby union team
National rugby sevens teams